Nike Air Max is a line of shoes produced by Nike, Inc., with the first model released in 1987. Air Max shoes are identified by their midsoles incorporating flexible urethane pouches filled with pressurized gas, visible from the exterior of the shoe and intended to provide cushioning to the underfoot. Air Max was conceptualized by Tinker Hatfield, who initially worked for Nike designing stores.

Overview

M. Frank Rudy, an aeronautical engineer, first brought the idea of an air-cushioned sole to Nike in 1977. In 1979, he patented a design using polyurethane sacs filled with pressurized inert gas, and Nike has been using some version of this design ever since. As the name indicates, all Air Max shoes feature one or more translucent pouches of pressurized gas embedded in the midsole and visible from the outside of the shoe. Referred to as "Air units" or "airbags," their stated purpose is to provide superior cushioning to traditional foam while also reducing weight. The effectiveness of the technology for this purpose is disputed; nevertheless, the shoes enjoy consistent popularity, especially among sneaker enthusiasts and collectors. 

The size, design, and number of air units varies within the product line; the "retro" Air Max 1 simply includes one small unit under the heel, while in the contemporary Air VaporMax, effectively the entire midsole is composed of air units with no conventional foam present.

Culture and fashion
The line of sneakers is popular amongst many subcultures, for example hip hop and gabber.

In the mid-1990s the line, especially the Air Max 95 model, experienced such a surge of popularity in Japan that it led to a phenomenon known as "Air Max hunting". The extremely inflated prices of the shoes led to a rash of muggings in the normally-peaceful country wherein Air Max wearers were attacked and their shoes were stolen. Even used shoes were in demand, and fakes also became a problem.

Models

Air Max 1
Released in 1987 as simply the Air Max, the Air Max 1 was the first shoe ever to employ Max Air technology. It was marketed for running, which would continue to be the case for new Air Max designs until 2018's Air Max 270. Its upper was composed of nylon and synthetic felt, with a leather version being released in 1988. The Air Max 1 continues to enjoy significant popularity with sneaker enthusiasts, with Nike releasing "retro" models employing both original and pre-existing exterior designs ("colorways") on a regular basis. The Air Max 1 between 2018 and 2022 has been released as a golf shoe type called the Air Max 1G.

Air Max Light
Released in 1989 as the Air Max II, the Air Max Light weighed less than the original, achieved by replacing the forefoot polyurethane midsole with one made of EVA foam. Re-released in 2007, Nike has continued to release additional colorways.

Air Max 90

Known as the Air Max III until 2000, when it was reissued taking its name from the year of its launch. The original colourway of white/black/cool grey with infrared was chosen to exaggerate the thickness of the sole air cushion. The upper featured Duromesh, synthetic felt and synthetic leather.  Nike specially designed a pair of Nike Air Max 90s for President George H. W. Bush. Images of the customized sneakers have been seen around the Department of Nike Archives, and feature AIR PRES branding along with what appears to be a unique colorway.

Air Max 180
Released in 1991, the Air Max 180 featured a larger air unit visible through the outsole.  The technology was later used in the Air Force 180 sneaker.

Air Max 93
Released in 1993 as the Air Max 270, the Air Max 93 introduced a 270-degree air unit and colored air units to the range.  Nike employed a new manufacturing processes to provide the larger and more exposed air unit greater protection. The upper featured a more sock-like fit derived from 1991's Air Huarache sneaker.

Air Max2 CB 94
The Nike Air Max2 CB 94 was released in 1994. Designed as a basketball shoe by Tracy Teague, it was inspired by professional basketball player Charles Barkley.

Air Max 95
The visual design of the Air Max 95 was created by Sergio Lozano, who based the design of the Air Max 95 on the human anatomy, with the spine of the shoe resembling the human spine and the materials intended to represent skin, ribs, and tendons. The Air Max 95 was the first pair in the line to utilize two air cushions in the forefoot and used air pressure technology to fit the curvature of the wearer's forefoot.  The first colorway was black, neon yellow and white.  Neon yellow was used to emphasize the multiple air units.  The shoe also introduced a smaller Nike swoosh minimized in the rear side panel.  Original releases featured a "25 PSI" air pressure reading on the rear air unit.  Uppers also featured 3M Scotchlite material.

The product was referenced in the hip hop song "Hate It or Love It" by The Game, which was a worldwide top 10 hit in 2005. Also referenced by rappers Gucci Mane in the hit single "Bricks" and Waka Flocka Flame on the track "Head First" in his 2009 mixtape, "Lebron Flocka James". The rapper Eminem designed a limited-edition range of Air Maxes sold for charity.

Air Max 97

1997's Air Max 97 was inspired by high-speed Japanese bullet trains.  It was introduced with a sleeker, metallic silver colorway that contained a nearly full-length visible air unit.  Uppers feature three reflective lines made of 3M Scotchlite material.

The Nike Air Max 97 is a Nike running shoe designed by Christian Tresser. It was inspired by Japan's high-speed Bullet Trains and features a mix of leather, foam, and full-length visible Air. The original "Silver Bullet" colorway released again in the US on April 13th, 2017 for $160. Over 13 new colorways are hitting retailers starting August 1st, 2017.

Some of the colorways are Khaki, White/Red, Tea Berry, Metallic Silver, B-sides Pack, Guava Ice, True Brown, Pittsburgh Steelers, Phantom, Red/White/Blue, Just Do It, Elemental Pink, Desert and Sky, Luxurious Tan, Ocean Bliss, Midnight Navy, Tartan, Mustard, and Metallic Gold.

Air Max Plus Tuned

Released in 1998, the Air Max Plus introduced Nike's Tuned Air system., and as such became retrospectively known as the Air Max TN, Air Max Tuned, or Air Max Tuned 1 (TN1).  Designed by Sean McDowell, the Air Max Plus featured transverse waves inspired by palm trees, and a prominent arch shank inspired by a whale tail.  The initial release featured a "Hyper Blue" colorway, characterized by a fading blue airbrush effect. The Nike swoosh had a slightly irregular appearance as a border was added along the inner edge, as opposed to the outer surface.  Although the shoe only had modest success in North America, in Europe they were massively popular - particularly in France, where the Plus grew to enjoy iconic status among youth culture in Paris and Marseille, where the shoe has the nickname Le Requin ("The Shark") -  often anglicised into "Rekin". Part of the shoe's appeal is both its exclusivity (for many years it was only available from Foot Locker stores) and its high price. In some areas of LGBT sub-culture in France and many other European nations (most notably Germany and the United Kingdom) the Plus/TN is one of the most coveted Air Max models among foot, sneaker and sportswear fetishists.

Australia was another major market for the Air Max Plus - infamously the shoe became popular with gang culture and criminals, to the point where wearers of the shoe were banned from some pubs and clubs.

Air Max 360
On January 21, 2006 Nike launched the Air Max 360, a new shoe design that utilized Max Air throughout the shoe's midsole. In September 2006 Nike introduced a special 'one time only pack' which fused the 360 model with three classics. The three shoes used were the Air Max 90, Air Max 95, and Air Max 97. For this special release, the design of the 360 sole was used in place of the normal sole of the three classics. The shoes were released in the three original colors: red for the Air Max 90, green/yellow for the Air Max 95, and grey/silver for the Air Max 97. Like other Air Max releases, deluxe editions were also produced. These deluxe editions lasted for about  before their shock-absorbing properties deteriorated. The use of '360' of air cushioning is meant to ensure the shoe's longevity.

Air VaporMax
The Air VaporMax released in March 2017, and was the first Air Max shoe to use no foam or rubber whatsoever in the midsole or outsole. It discarded a traditional midsole/outsole design and in place used several entirely hollow air pouches, not connected to one another and positioned in different areas in accordance with where the wearer's foot would naturally strike. The VaporMax sole itself has not been significantly innovated upon since its initial release, but original shoes using the sole design continue to be released, including several "hybrids" which fuse a VaporMax sole with the upper design of an older Air Max shoe such as the Air Max 95, 97, and 360.

Air Max 270 
The shoe was originally released on February 1, 2018. It was named "270" for the 270 degrees of visibility in the Air unit around the shoe, and was inspired by the Air Max 93 and 180 shoes. It was the first Air Max shoe to be designed for lifestyle and golf purposes rather than running. It also was the tallest Air unit to ever be released at the time, measuring 32 mm tall.

Air Max 720 
One year after the Air Max 270, Nike debuted their second Air unit to be designed for lifestyle purposes with the Air Max 720. As opposed to the heel-only 270 Air unit, the 720 Air unit extends under the forefoot, and is also taller than the 270 by 6mm. New colorways of the Air Max 720 and additional designs based on its Air unit, including the basketball-inspired Air Max 720 SATRN and a hybrid based on the retro Air More up-tempo, continue to be released.

Advertising 
The shoes were initially advertised in 1987 with a TV campaign that used the Beatles' song "Revolution", the first time a Beatles song had been used in a TV commercial.  The following year, Nike used the Just Do It slogan. They were also endorsed by Bo Jackson in exchange for a $100,000 fee, with advertising agency Wieden and Kennedy coming up with the slogan "Bo knows...".

Gallery

References

External links

 How A Dutch Subculture Called "Gabber" Embraced the Air Max BW

 

Air Max, Nike
Products introduced in 1987
Sneaker culture